Eric Temple Bell (7 February 1883 – 21 December 1960) was a Scottish-born mathematician and science fiction writer who lived in the United States for most of his life. He published non-fiction using his given name and fiction as John Taine.

Early life and education

Eric Temple Bell was born in Peterhead, Aberdeen, Scotland as third of three children to Helen Jane Lyall and James Bell Jr. His father, a factor, relocated to San Jose, California,  in 1884, when Eric was fifteen months old. After his father died on 4 January 1896, the family returned to Bedford, England.

Bell was educated at Bedford Modern School, where his teacher Edward Mann Langley inspired him to continue the study of mathematics. Bell returned to the United States, by way of Montreal, in 1902. He received degrees from Stanford University (1904), the University of Washington (1908), and Columbia University (1912) (where he was a student of Cassius Jackson Keyser).

Career
Bell was part of the faculty first at the University of Washington and later at the California Institute of Technology. While at the University of Washington, he taught Howard P. Robertson and encouraged him to enroll at Cal Tech for his doctoral studies.

Bell researched number theory; see in particular Bell series. He attempted—not altogether successfully—to make the traditional umbral calculus (understood at that time to be the same thing as the "symbolic method" of Blissard) logically rigorous. He also did much work using generating functions, treated as formal power series, without concern for convergence. He is the eponym of the Bell polynomials and the Bell numbers of combinatorics.

In 1924 Bell was awarded the Bôcher Memorial Prize for his work in mathematical analysis. In 1927, he was elected to the National Academy of Sciences. He died in 1960 in Watsonville, California.

Work

Fiction and poetry
During the early 1920s, Bell wrote several long poems. He also wrote several science fiction novels, which independently invented some of the earliest devices and ideas of science fiction. Only the novel The Purple Sapphire was published at the time, using the pseudonym John Taine; this was before Hugo Gernsback and the genre publication of science fiction. His novels were published later, both in book form and serialised in magazines. Basil Davenport, writing in The New York Times, described Taine as "one of the first real scientists to write science-fiction [who] did much to bring it out of the interplanetary cops-and-robbers stage." But he concluded that "[Taine] is sadly lacking as a novelist, in style and especially in characterization."

Writing about mathematics
Bell wrote a book of biographical essays titled Men of Mathematics (one chapter of which was the first popular account of the 19th century mathematician Sofia Kovalevskaya), which is still in print. He originally wrote it under the title The Lives of Mathematicians, but the publishers, Simon and Schuster, cut about a third of it (125,000 words), and, in order to tie in with their book Men of Art (by Thomas Craven), gave it the title Men of Mathematics which he did not like. The book inspired notable mathematicians including Julia Robinson, John Forbes Nash, Jr., and Andrew Wiles to begin a career in mathematics. However, historians of mathematics have disputed the accuracy of much of Bell's history. In fact, Bell does not distinguish carefully between anecdote and history. He has been much criticized for romanticizing Évariste Galois. For example: "[E. T.] Bell's account [of Galois's life], by far the most famous, is also the most fictitious." His treatment of Georg Cantor, which reduced Cantor's relationships with his father and with Leopold Kronecker to stereotypes, has been criticized even more severely.

While this book was under printing, he also wrote and had published another book, The Handmaiden of the Sciences. Bell's later book Development of Mathematics has been less famous, but his biographer Constance Reid finds it has fewer weaknesses. 
His book on Fermat's Last Theorem, The Last Problem, was published the year after his death and is a hybrid of social history and the history of mathematics. It inspired mathematician Andrew Wiles to solve the problem.

In his book about Paul Erdős, titled The Man Who Loved Only Numbers, Paul Hoffman wrote:

Non-fiction books
 An Arithmetical Theory of Certain Numerical Functions, Seattle Washington, The University, 1915, 50p. PDF/DjVu copy from Internet Archive.
  The Cyclotomic Quinary Quintic, Lancaster, Pennsylvania, The New Era Printing Company, 1912, 97p.
 Algebraic Arithmetic, New York, American Mathematical Society, 1927, 180p.
 Debunking Science, Seattle, University of Washington book store, 1930, 40p.
 The Queen of the Sciences, Stechert, 1931, 138p.
 Numerology, Baltimore: The Williams & Wilkins Co., 1933, 187p. 
 Reprint: Westport, CT: Hyperion Press, 1979, 187p. – "Reprint of the ed. published by Century Co., New York" 
 The Search for Truth, Baltimore, Reynal and Hitchcock, 1934, 279p.
 Reprint: Williams and Wilkins Co, 1935
 The Handmaiden of the Sciences, Williams & Wilkins, 1937, 216p.
 Man and His Lifebelts, New York, Reynal & Hitchcock, 1938, 340p.
 Reprint: George Allen & Unwin Ltd., 1935, 2nd printing 1946
 Reprint: Kessinger Publishing, 2005
 Men of Mathematics, New York, Simon & Schuster, 1937, 592p.
 Reprint: Touchstone (Simon & Schuster paperback), 1986.  
 The Development of Mathematics, New York, McGraw–Hill, 1940, 637p.
Second Edition: New York, McGraw–Hill, 1945, 637p.
Reprint: Dover Publications, 1992
 The Magic of Numbers, Whittlesey House, 1946, 418p.
Reprint: New York, Dover Publications, 1991, 418p.
Reprint: Sacred Science Institute, 2006
 Mathematics: Queen and Servant of Science, McGraw-Hill, 1951, 437p.
 The Last Problem, New York, Simon & Schuster, 1961, 308p.
 Reprint: Mathematical Association of America, 1990, 326p.

Scholarly papers
 "Arithmetical paraphrases". In: Transactions of the American Mathematical Society 22, 1921, pp. 1–30 and 198–219
 "Arithmetical equivalents for a remarkable identity between theta functions". In: Mathematische Zeitschrift 13, 1922, pp. 146–152
 "Existence theorems on the numbers of representations of odd integers as sums of 4t + 2 squares". In: Crelles Journal 163, 1930, pp. 65–70
 "Exponential numbers". In: The American Mathematical Monthly 41, 1934, pp. 411–419

Novels

 The Purple Sapphire (1924)
 The Gold Tooth (1927)
 Quayle's Invention (1927)
 Green Fire (1928)
 The Greatest Adventure (1929)
 The Iron Star (1930)
 The White Lily (1930)
 The Time Stream (1931)
 Seeds of Life (1931)
 Before the Dawn (1934)
 Tomorrow (1939)
 The Forbidden Garden (1947)
 The Cosmic Geoids and One Other (1949)
 The Crystal Horde (1952)
 G.O.G. 666 (1954)

Poetry
 The Singer (1916)

References

Sources
 Reid, Constance (1993). The Search for E. T. Bell, Also Known as John Taine. Washington, DC: Mathematical Association of America. x + 372 pp. . .
 Rothman, T. (1982). "Genius and biographers: the fictionalization of Evariste Galois". American Mathematics Monthly 89, no. 2, 84–106.

Further reading

External links

Biographical sketch by Constance Reid
 
 
 
 MAA presidents: Eric Temple
 
  (distinct from Bell)
  (distinct from Taine)
 Author profile in the database zbMATH

 

1883 births
1960 deaths
People educated at Bedford Modern School
20th-century American novelists
20th-century American male writers
20th-century American mathematicians
American science fiction writers
Scottish science fiction writers
American historians of mathematics
Scottish expatriates in the United States
Scottish mathematicians
Combinatorialists
Mathematics popularizers
Presidents of the Mathematical Association of America
20th-century Scottish writers
American male novelists
Stanford University alumni
University of Washington alumni
Columbia University alumni
University of Washington faculty
California Institute of Technology faculty
People from Peterhead
People from Watsonville, California
Scottish novelists
Novelists from California
Novelists from Washington (state)
Members of the United States National Academy of Sciences